Buraki-ye Bala or Buraki Bala may refer to:
 Buraki-ye Bala, Kavar
 Buraki-ye Bala, Kazerun